Nodar Kancheli (21 April 1938 – 26 June 2015) was a Russian architect who designed a number of facilities including the Transvaal Park water park in Yasenevo and Basmanny Market. These two structures collapsed, killing a total of at least 89 people.

References

External links
31 dead in Moscow roof collapse
Russian architects: Nodar V. Kancheli

1938 births
2015 deaths
Russian architects
Russian people of Georgian descent